Throne of Darkness is a Japanese-themed action role-playing game released in 2001 by Sierra On-Line, a subsidiary of Vivendi Universal Interactive Publishing. Players control up to four (out of seven) different samurai at a time. The game has three separate multiplayer modes which support up to 35 players.

Plot
The game is set in Yamato, a medieval version of Japan ruled by the shogun Tsunayoshi and the daimyō of the four clans. To become immortal, Tsunayoshi transforms himself into the demon Zanshin, the Dark Warlord, who unleashes his army of darkness to conquer Yamato. Zanshin's forces sweep across Yamato one night, catching the clans by surprise and annihilating them. However, believing that the four daimyō were killed, Zanshin recalls his soldiers prematurely, leaving one daimyō and seven of his retainers alive. As dawn breaks, the daimyō decides to counterattack, ordering his seven surviving samurai to destroy Zanshin and his minions.

The four clans and daimyō are named after historical Japanese clans and persons:

The Mōri clan, led by daimyō Mōri Motonari.
The Oda clan, led by daimyō Oda Nobunaga.
The Tokugawa clan, led by daimyō Tokugawa Ieyasu.
The Toyotomi clan, led by daimyō Toyotomi Hideyoshi.

Gameplay
Gameplay resembles Diablo II, as many of the game's developers worked on Diablo.

Reception

The game received "average" reviews according to the review aggregation website Metacritic. Blake Fischer of NextGen said that the game was "Fun but frustrating. Ultimately, the steep learning curve (formations? Don't even ask...) and increased micromanagement keep this game from being a Diablo II killer.'"

The game was a finalist for The Electric Playgrounds "Best RPG for PC" award at the Blister Awards 2001, but lost the prize to Arcanum: Of Steamworks and Magick Obscura.

References

External links

2001 video games
Action role-playing video games
Cultural depictions of Oda Nobunaga
Fantasy video games
Japan in non-Japanese culture
Video games about samurai
Video games developed in the United States
Video games set in Japan
Video games with isometric graphics
Windows games
Windows-only games